Höfen is a municipality in the district of Reutte in the Austrian state of Tyrol.

Geography
Höfen lies southwest of Reutte on the left bank of the Lech.

References

Cities and towns in Reutte District